Eric Isaac Utere, known professionally as LeriQ, is a Nigerian record producer and songwriter. He is currently signed to Spaceship Records, through Spaceship Collective.. He achieved recognition for his work on Burna Boy's 2012 single Like To Party, and went on to produce the singer's debut album L.I.F.E (2013), and Twice as Tall (2020), which earned him an award at the 63rd Grammy ceremony.

Early life and career
LeriQ is the first born of a family of six boys, born in Rivers State but hails from Akwa Ibom State in the southern part of Nigeria.  LeriQ Started producing at the age of 13, citing his love for art, his love for musical sounds and the influence of his Dad, a renowned stage designer and artist and his brothers, one a video director another a singer/dancer. LeriQ signed a deal with Sony Music Africa in July, 2015, and signed a production deal with Spaceship Records, through Spaceship Collective.

LeriQ released a producer album in 2015, titled The Lost Sounds. The album featured artistes such as Illbliss, Chidimma, Burna Boy, Dammy Krane, Cassper Nyovest, Wande Coal, Seyi Shay,  Wizkid, Phyno, Nneka, 2face Idibia, Efya, Bez, Naeto C and Timaya. In September, 2016 LeriQ teamed up with Burna Boy to produce Burna Boy new extended play titled "Redemption", a self produced project by LeriQ, after Burna Boy debut L.I.F.E, he self produced in 2013 before they both the reunion, to produce "Redemption".

Production Discography 
Singles produced
Burna Boy
"Like to Party"
"Tonight"
"Always Love You"
"Run My Race"
"Pree Me" 
"Fa So LaTi Do" 
"Boshe Nlo" 
"Mary Jane" 
"Body to Body #YCD"
"Plenty Song" 
"We On"
"Way Too Big"
"No Fit Vex"
The Lost Sounds

"Where You Dey (feat. Illbliss, Chidimma & OZone)"       
"Multiply (feat. LOS & Kamar Tachio)"      
"Comment Tu T'Appelle (feat. Burna Boy, Dammy Krane, Mojeed & OZone)"    
"Hell of It (feat. Kayswitch & Cassper Nyovest)"
"Wish List (feat. Wande Coal)"
"XtaSy (feat. Seyi Shay)"
"All I Need (feat. Redsan & Shaydee)"
"Say You Love Me (feat. Wizkid)"
"Turn Up (feat. Burna Boy & Phyno)"
"Stand Still (feat. Nneka)"
"Answers (feat. 2Face Idibia)"
"Show Me (feat. Efya)"
"Let You Go (feat. Wurld)"
"Let Me Love You (feat. BeZ & Mojeed)"
"Nagode (feat. Naeto C & Kamar Tachio)"
"Easy Thing (feat. Trigga Mad Tonic)"
"Aunty (feat. Timaya)"
"Lataba (feat. Pucado)"
"Peace (feat. Timi Kay & Aina More)"
"Smell of Success (feat. Show Dem Camp, Suté & Tay)"

LeriQ Singles

LeriQ Albums

Awards

References 

Living people
Nigerian hip hop record producers
Nigerian songwriters
Songwriters from Rivers State
Year of birth missing (living people)